Spirit of 76 is a pinball game designed by Ed Krynski and Wayne Neyens and released in 1975 by Gottlieb. The pinball machine should not be confused with the pinball machine The Spirit of '76 by Mirco Games, Inc.

Two other versions of this pinball machine were released in 1976: Pioneer - a two-player version and New York - a special 2-player Add-a-ball version in celebration of the 1976 lifting of the ban of pinball in New York City.

Description
The pinball game Spirit of 76 was made to celebrate the 200th birthday of the United States. The backbox of the machine has art from America's heroes. The red white and blue theme dominates the game. Minutemen, covered wagons and rockets are displayed on the playfield. Stars and stripes, representing the flag of the United States, are on the side of the table.

Digital version
The table was virtually recreated in pinball simulation video game, Microsoft Pinball Arcade.

References

External links
Spirit of 76 on the Internet Pinball Database
Pioneer on the Internet Pinball Database
New York on the Internet Pinball Database

1975 pinball machines
Gottlieb pinball machines